Larry Howes (born June 30, 1947) is a Minnesota politician and former member of the Minnesota House of Representatives representing District 4B, which includes portions of Cass, Crow Wing and Hubbard counties in the northern part of the state. A Republican, he is also a summer camp manager and caretaker.

Howes was first elected in 1998, and was re-elected in 2000, 2002, 2004, 2006, 2008 and 2010. He was a member of the House Finance Committee and Rules and Legislative Administration Committee. He also served on the Finance subcommittees for the Capital Investment Finance Division, on which he was the ranking minority party member, the Cultural and Outdoor Resources Finance Division, and the Housing Finance and Policy and Public Health Finance Division. He chaired the Commerce and Financial Institutions Subcommittee for the Tourism Division during the 2005-2006 biennium.

References

External links 

 Rep. Howes Web Page
 Minnesota Public Radio Votetracker: Rep. Larry Howes
 Project Votesmart - Rep. Larry Howes Profile

1947 births
Living people
People from Walker, Minnesota
Republican Party members of the Minnesota House of Representatives
21st-century American politicians